Naja Gewog (Dzongkha: ན་རྒྱ་) is a gewog (village block) of Paro District, Bhutan. In 2002, the gewog had an area of 151.8 square kilometres and contained 13 villages and 355 households.

References

Gewogs of Bhutan
Paro District